Jonathan Stewart (born November 23, 1990) is a former American football linebacker. He played college football at Texas A&M.

Early years
Stewart attended C. E. Byrd High School in Shreveport, Louisiana. In his senior year, the Byrd Yellow Jackets went 9–3 on the season, losing 20–7 to Ouachita Parish.

Professional career

2013 NFL Draft

The St. Louis Rams signed him as an undrafted free agent. On December 4, 2013, Stewart signed with the Cleveland Browns practice squad. On December 10, Stewart was released by the Browns.

References

External links

Texas A&M Aggies Bio

1990 births
Living people
American football linebackers
African-American players of American football
Texas A&M Aggies football players
St. Louis Rams players
Dallas Cowboys players
21st-century African-American sportspeople